A list of films produced by the Israeli film industry in 2002.

2002 releases

Awards
{|
|- valign="top"
|

Ophir Award

Wolgin Award

See also
2002 in Israel

References

External links
 Israeli films of 2002 at the Internet Movie Database

Israeli
Film
2002